East Central Community College (ECCC) is a junior college located in Decatur, Mississippi. ECCC serves a five-county district: Leake, Neshoba, Newton, Scott and Winston counties. It opened in September 1928.

Band
The Band's name is the Wall O' Sound Marching Band (WOS). It was named by band director, Thomas W. Carson. Carson died in 2013. In 2014 Hunter Corhern was named the head director. In 2015, Edward Girling III was named interim head director and was then officially named head director in 2016. Edward Girling put together his final Wall O' Sound halftime show for the 2019 ECCC football season and retired in 2020. The Wall O' Sound is now under the direction of Mr. Zach Langley. The band is known throughout Mississippi for its halftime shows that feature various selections of music, captivating drill, the dazzling Centralettes, and the "Wall O' Sound" of which it produces. The WOS performs at all ECCC home football games, playoff games, and bowl games and select away games with a pep band traveling to all away games. The band also performs in various events and parades in the surrounding area including the MHSAA Region III Marching Band Evaluations, the Newton Christmas Parade, the Union Christmas Parade, the Carthage Christmas Parade, the Forest Christmas Parade, the Decatur Christmas Parade, and the Philadelphia MLK Parade. Instrumental scholarships for the Wall O' Sound cover full tuition at East Central Community College.

Athletics
The "Warriors" is the name of the ECCC athletic teams and their colors are black and gold. They are a member of the NJCAA Region 23 and of the MACJC. ECCC sponsors 9 sports (5 men and 4 women) including football, softball, baseball, men's and women's basketball, men's and women's soccer, and men's and women's tennis.

Notable alumni
Phyliss J. Anderson, Tribal Chief of the Mississippi Band of Choctaw Indians
Tim Anderson, MLB baseball player
Kendrick Clancy, NFL football player
Billy Dean, country music singer and writer
Antonio Gibson, NFL football player
Randy Houser, country music singer and writer
Billy Nicholson, Mississippi state legislator
Bennett Malone, Mississippi state legislator
D. Michael Hurst Jr., lawyer
Trent Kelly, Mississippi U.S. Representative
Justin Sharp, American composer and pianist

References

External links
Official website

Community colleges in Mississippi
Educational institutions established in 1928
Universities and colleges accredited by the Southern Association of Colleges and Schools
Education in Newton County, Mississippi
Buildings and structures in Newton County, Mississippi
NJCAA athletics
1928 establishments in Mississippi